Hoštice is a municipality and village in Strakonice District in the South Bohemian Region of the Czech Republic. It has about 100 inhabitants.

Notable people
Václav Leopold Chlumčanský (1749–1830), Archbishop of Prague
Michal Tučný (1947–1995), singer; lived here and is buried here
Zdeněk Troška (born 1953), film director

References

External links

Villages in Strakonice District